MV Cebu City was a ferry operated by William Lines Incorporated (which later merged with Aboitiz Incorporated in 1996).

Sinking 
On December 2, 1994, the 2,452-tonne ferry sank in Manila Bay after colliding with Singaporean freighter Kota Suria, claiming 140 lives. After the investigation by the Philippine Coast Guard, the crew of Cebu City was found responsible for the incident. The collision could have been avoided if the Cebu City had obeyed a call from the freighter Kota Suria to turn to starboard. Instead, Cebu City reportedly turned to port and crossed Kota Suria's path.

See also 
 List of maritime disasters in the Philippines

References

Shipwrecks in Manila Bay
Ferries of the Philippines
Maritime incidents in the Philippines
Maritime incidents in 1994